Ceratophyllus titicacensis is a species of flea in the family Ceratophyllidae. It was described by Boheman in 1866.

References 

Ceratophyllidae
Insects described in 1866